The eighth HMS Vanguard of the British Royal Navy was an  central battery ironclad battleship, by Edward Reed launched in 1870. In 1875, the ship was sunk during a summer cruise in a collision in fog with the ironclad . None of the crew were lost, but the commanding officer of the ship never commanded another vessel in his career. The wreck lies near the Kish lightship off the coast of Ireland and is protected under the Irish National Monument Act.

Design and construction
The ship normally displaced .

Propulsion
Vanguard was with two sets of 2-cylinder horizontal single expansion, return connecting-rod and 6 rectangular boilers that drove twin screws.

Armament
Her armament consisted of ten  12-ton MLR guns all in a two-tier central battery where six were on MD and two on UD. Furthermore she had four /64-pounder (71 cwt) MLR on UD, with two forward and two aft and six 20-pounder guns for saluting.

Service history
The ships were part of the First Reserve Squadron and were on a summer cruise around the Irish coast. The squadron — under the command of Admiral Tarleton, was en route to Queenstown (Cobh), County Cork where the cruise would finish. As they passed the Kish lightship, a heavy fog came down which restricted visibility to less than a ship's length.
Vanguards sister ship — Iron Duke — noticed she was drifting off course and began returning to her proper station. A problem with her steam plant rendered her foghorn inoperable, and could not be used to alert the other vessels of her position or course.
At about 12:50, a look-out on Vanguard spotted a sailing ship directly ahead. Collision was unavoidable. Iron Dukes underwater ram tore open Vanguards hull near her boilers.

Iron Duke freed herself after a few minutes, sustaining only minor damage. Vanguard, however, was sinking. Her pumps could move water at a rate of 3,000 lb/min (23 kg/s) but the flooding exceeded 50 long tons per minute (847 kg/s). The pumps were powered by the engines, which shut down ten minutes after the collision when the engine room flooded.

Vanguard and Iron Duke both launched all boats. The abandonment was completed in good order with Captain Dawkins the last of the 360 crew aboard to leave and the only casualty was his dog which was lost. Warrior and Hector sailed on in the fog and only learned of the sinking upon reaching Queenstown.

The tips of her masts were still visible above the surface. The Admiralty was confident that the ship could be raised and diving operations started, but were soon abandoned. Captain Dawkins was blamed at the court martial for not doing enough to save his vessel following the collision, and never received command of another vessel. Contemporary popular opinion, however, was sympathetic towards him.

The wreck is protected under the Irish National Monument Act, and a licence from the National Monuments Service is required to dive it.

Notes and references

Bibliography

 

 

 R. Winfield/D. Lyon: The Sail and Steam Navy List. All the Ships of the Royal Navy 1815–1889. Chatham Publishing, London 2004, 

 

Audacious-class ironclads
Victorian-era battleships of the United Kingdom
Maritime accidents involving fog
Shipwrecks in the Irish Sea
1870 ships
Maritime incidents in September 1875
Ships sunk in collisions
Ships with box type boilers